Xocotl ("Plum" in Nahuatl) is the Aztec god of the planet Venus and of fire. He is probably related to Xolotl, the god of lightning and death.

Aztec gods
Venusian deities
Fire gods